Volvarina is a genus of small to very small sea snails, marine gastropod molluscs in the family Marginellidae, the margin shells.

The difference between the genera Volvarina and Prunum is not clearly delineated and is based on morphological differences in the shells. Larger species with a strong callus are classified under Prunum, while the slender species with a thin callus are classified under Volvarina. Many species with characteristics that fall between the two extremes are ambiguous. Until at least 2010 there was no phylogenetic analysis to substantiate this classification.

Species
Species within the genus Volvarina include:

 Volvarina abbotti (de Jong & Coomans, 1988) (after R. Tucker Abbott)
 Volvarina abdieli Espinosa, Ortea & Diez, 2015
 Volvarina adela (Thiele, 1925)
 Volvarina adrianadiae Cossignani, 2006
 Volvarina aethrae Espinosa & Ortea, 2015
 Volvarina affinis (Reeve, 1865)
 Volvarina agatha Laseron, 1957
 Volvarina aglae Espinosa & Ortea, 2015
 Volvarina aladunniae Ortea, 2014
 Volvarina alamarensis Espinosa & Ortea, 2013
 Volvarina alayoi Espinosa, Ortea & Diez, 2015
 Volvarina alayoni Espinosa & Ortea, 2015
 Volvarina albescens (Hutton, 1873)
 Volvarina albolineata (d'Orbigny, 1842), white-line marginella
 Volvarina alcoladoi Espinosa & Ortea, 1998
 Volvarina aldeynzeri Cossignani, 2005
 Volvarina alejandroi Espinosa, Ortea & Moro, 2009
 Volvarina algazaliae Ortea, 2014
 Volvarina aliceae Espinosa & Ortea, 2012
 Volvarina alloginella Espinosa, Moro & Ortea, 2011
 Volvarina ameliensis (Tomlin, 1917)
 Volvarina ampelusica Monterosato, 1906
 Volvarina amphitrite Espinosa & Ortea, 2015
 Volvarina anamariae Espinosa & Ortea, 2015
 Volvarina anao Espinosa & Ortea, 2012
 Volvarina andyi Espinosa & Ortea, 2013
 Volvarina angolensis (Odhner, 1923)
 Volvarina angustata (G.B. Sowerby, 1846)
 Volvarina anjatheilae T. Cossignani & Lorenz, 2018
 Volvarina arabica Boyer, 2015
 Volvarina ardovinii Cossignani, 1997
 Volvarina ariadnae Espinosa & Ortea, 2015
 Volvarina armonica Cossignani, 1997
 Volvarina arrecifensis Espinosa, Ortea & Moro, 2013
 Volvarina artemisae Espinosa & Ortea, 2013
 Volvarina artilesi Espinosa, Ortea & Moro, 2014 
 Volvarina atabey Espinosa, Ortea & Moro, 2009
 Volvarina attenuata (Reeve, 1865)
 Volvarina augerea Laseron, 1957
 Volvarina avena (Kiener, 1834), orange-band marginella
 Volvarina avenella (Dall, 1881)
 Volvarina avesensis Caballer, Espinosa & Ortea, 2013
 Volvarina bacona Espinosa, Ortea & Diez, 2012
 Volvarina baenai Espinosa & Ortea, 2003
 Volvarina banesensis Espinosa & Ortea, 1999
 Volvarina barbierorum T. Cossignani & Lorenz, 2020
 Volvarina barbosae Ortea, 2014
 Volvarina barbuyae Ortea, 2014
 Volvarina bavecchii Cossignani, 2006
 Volvarina bayeri Gracia & Boyer, 2004
 Volvarina bazini Jousseaume, 1875
 Volvarina beatrix T. Cossignani & Lorenz, 2019
 Volvarina bellamatancera Espinosa & Ortea, 2015
 Volvarina bernardoi Espinosa, Ortea & Diez, 2015
 Volvarina bessei Boyer, 2001
 Volvarina betyae Espinosa & Ortea, 1998
 Volvarina bevdeynzerae Cossignani, 2005
 Volvarina bifurcata Boyer, 2015
 Volvarina borinquensis Espinosa & Ortea, 2015
 Volvarina borroi (Espinosa & Ortea, 1998)
 Volvarina boucheti Espinosa & Ortea, 2012
 Volvarina bouhamedae Ortea, 2014
 Volvarina boyeri Moreno & Burnay, 1999
 Volvarina brasiliana Boyer, 2000
 Volvarina bravoae Ortea, 2014
 Volvarina brucebrandti T. Cossignani & Lorenz, 2019
 Volvarina brunoi Espinosa & Ortea, 2013
 Volvarina buenavistaensis Espinosa, Moro & Ortea, 2011
 Volvarina bullula (Reeve, 1865)
 Volvarina caballeri Espinosa & Ortea, 2012
 Volvarina cachoi Espinosa & Ortea, 1997
 Volvarina calliopeae Espinosa & Ortea, 2015
 Volvarina callypsoe Espinosa & Ortea, 2015
 Volvarina candida T. Cossignani & Lorenz, 2019
 Volvarina caonabae Espinosa, Ortea & Moro, 2010
 Volvarina caprina Espinosa & Ortea, 2015
 Volvarina caprottii T. Cossignani & Lorenz, 2019
 Volvarina caribetica Espinosa, Ortea & Magaña, 2018
 Volvarina carmelae Espinosa & Ortea, 1998
 Volvarina casiguaya Espinosa, Ortea & Diez, 2015
 Volvarina ceciliae Espinosa & Ortea, 1999
 Volvarina cernita (Locard, 1897)
 Volvarina charbarensis (Melvill, 1897)
 Volvarina charretonae Ortea, 2014
 Volvarina cienaguera Espinosa, Ortea & Moro, 2010
 Volvarina cienfueguera Espinosa, Ortea & Diez, 2015
 Volvarina cingalica Boyer, 2015
 Volvarina columba Espinosa, Moro & Ortea, 2011
 Volvarina compressa (Reeve, 1865)
 Volvarina confitesensis Espinosa, Ortea & Moro, 2010
 Volvarina consalvoi T. Cossignani & Lorenz, 2020
 Volvarina corallina (Bavay, 1910)
 Volvarina cordyorum Cossignani, 2009
 Volvarina corusca (Reeve, 1865)
 Volvarina criolla Espinosa & Ortea, 2003
 Volvarina cubana Espinosa & Ortea, 2015
 Volvarina curazaoensis Espinosa & Ortea, 2013
 Volvarina cybelesae Espinosa & Ortea, 2015
 Volvarina dalli Wakefield & McCleery, 2005
 Volvarina damasoi T. Cossignani, 2017
 Volvarina danielleae Espinosa & Ortea, 2012
 Volvarina davidi Espinosa, Ortea & Diez, 2015
 Volvarina dawnae Lussi & G. Smith, 1996
 Volvarina delanoisi T. Cossignani & Lorenz, 2018
 Volvarina deformis G., H & Nevill, 1874
 Volvarina deliciosa (Bavay in Dautzenberg, 1912)
 Volvarina denizi Espinosa, Ortea & Pérez-Dionis, 2014 
 Volvarina dennisi Espinosa, Ortea & Diez, 2015
 Volvarina dhofarensis Boyer, 2015
 Volvarina diminuta Laseron, 1957
 Volvarina dinisioi (T. Cossignani, 2006)
 Volvarina dirbergi Espinosa & Ortea, 2012
 Volvarina dorisae Espinosa & Ortea, 2015
 Volvarina dozei (Rochebrune & Mabille, 1889)
 Volvarina dulcemariae Espinosa & Ortea, 1998
 Volvarina dunkeri (Krauss, 1848)
 Volvarina dunkeri f.  kraussi Turton, 1932
 Volvarina ealesae (Powell, 1958)
 Volvarina effulgens (Reeve, 1865)
 Volvarina elgoyhenae Ortea, 2014
 Volvarina elliptica (Redfield, 1870)
 Volvarina elridiae Ortea, 2014
 Volvarina elsayedae Ortea, 2014
 Volvarina enrici Espinosa, J. Martin & Ortea, 2018
 Volvarina enriquei Espinosa & Ortea, 1998
 Volvarina eratoae Espinosa & Ortea, 2013
 Volvarina ericmonnieri T. Cossignani, 2018
 Volvarina eumorpha (Melvill, 1906)
 Volvarina evanida (Sowerby II, 1846)
 Volvarina exilis (Gmelin, 1791)
 Volvarina falusiae Ortea, 2014
 Volvarina fanabeensis Espinosa, Ortea & Pérez-Dionis, 2014
 Volvarina farrantae Ortea, 2014
 Volvarina fasciata Lussi & Smith, 1996
 Volvarina fanabeensis Espinosa, Ortea & Pérez-Dionis, 2014
 Volvarina fauna (Sowerby II, 1846)
 Volvarina ficoi Espinosa & Ortea, 2003
 Volvarina fifi Espinosa & Ortea, 2015
 Volvarina flamenca Espinosa, Moro & Ortea, 2011
 Volvarina florenceae Espinosa & Ortea, 2012
 Volvarina floresensis Espinosa & Ortea, 1999
 Volvarina fortunata Clover & Macca, 1990
 Volvarina francescoi T. Cossignani & Lorenz, 2018
 Volvarina franciscae Espinosa, Moro & Ortea, 2011
 Volvarina fraserorum T. Cossignani & Lorenz, 2020
 Volvarina frazzinii Cossignani, 2006
 Volvarina fugax Gofas & Fernandes, 1992
 Volvarina fulgida  (Lussi & G. Smith, 1999)
 Volvarina gabriellae  T. Cossignani, 2020
 Volvarina gargalloae  Ortea, 2014
 Volvarina garycooverti Espinosa & Ortea, 1998
 Volvarina gemma Espinosa & Ortea, 2015
 Volvarina gianmariacannarai T. Cossignani & Lorenz, 2019
 Volvarina ginae Espinosa & Ortea, 2003
 Volvarina giraldilla Espinosa & Ortea, 2013
 Volvarina gracilis (C.B. Adams, 1851)
 Volvarina granmaense Espinosa, Ortea & Diez, 2017
 Volvarina grosi Espinosa & Ortea, 2012
 Volvarina guajira Espinosa & Ortea, 1998
 Volvarina guamaense Espinosa, Ortea & Diez, 2015
 Volvarina guantanamera Espinosa, Moro & Ortea, 2011
 Volvarina guribae Ortea, 2014
 Volvarina habanera Espinosa & Ortea, 1997
 Volvarina haswelli Laseron, 1948
 Volvarina hedleyi (May, 1911)
 Volvarina helenae Espinosa & Ortea, 2003
 Volvarina hemingwayi Espinosa & Ortea, 2015
 Volvarina hennequini Boyer, 2001
 Volvarina heterozona Jousseaume, 1875
 Volvarina hirasei (Bavay, 1917)
 Volvarina holguinera Espinosa, Ortea & Diez, 2015
 Volvarina humboldtiana Espinosa, Ortea & Diez, 2015
 Volvarina hyalina (Thiele, 1912)
 Volvarina ibarrae Espinosa & Ortea, 1998
 Volvarina infans Laseron, 1957
 Volvarina ingloria (E. A. Smith, 1910)
 Volvarina ingolfi Bouchet & Waren, 1985
 Volvarina innexa Roth, 1978
 Volvarina insulana Gofas & Fernandes, 1988
 Volvarina ireneae Espinosa & Ortea, 2015
 Volvarina irisae Espinosa & Ortea, 2015
 Volvarina isabelae (Borro, 1946)
 Volvarina ivic Caballer, Espinosa & Ortea, 2009
 Volvarina ixchelae Espinosa & Ortea, 2015
 Volvarina jaguanensis Espinosa & Ortea, 1998
 Volvarina janneefsi Bozzetti, 1997
 Volvarina jibara Espinosa, Ortea & Diez, 2017
 Volvarina jimcordyi Cossignani, 2007
 Volvarina jordani Espinosa, Ortea & Moro, 2014
 Volvarina josieae Espinosa & Ortea, 2012
 Volvarina joubini (Dautzenberg & Fischer, 1906)
 Volvarina juancarlosi Espinosa, Ortea & Diez, 2015
 Volvarina juangarciai Espinosa & Ortea, 2013
 Volvarina juanitae Espinosa, Ortea & Moro, 2013
 Volvarina juanjoi Espinosa & Ortea, 1998
 Volvarina judymontae T. Cossignani & Lorenz, 2018
 Volvarina juraguaense Espinosa, Ortea & Diez, 2015
 Volvarina keppelensis Laseron, 1957
 Volvarina kharafiae Ortea, 2014
 Volvarina kidwelli Lussi & Smith, 1996
 Volvarina kilwaensis Boyer, 2015
 Volvarina koillerae Ortea, 2014
 Volvarina kratzschorum T. Cossignani & Lorenz, 2019
 Volvarina kyprisae Espinosa, Ortea & Moro, 2013
 Volvarina laciniatalabrum Lussi & Smith, 1996
 Volvarina lactea (Kiener, 1841)
 Volvarina laetitia (Thiele, 1925)
 Volvarina lakhdarae Ortea, 2014
 Volvarina lamyi Espinosa & Ortea, 2012
 Volvarina larramendii Espinosa, Ortea & Diez, 2015
 Volvarina latortuga Caballer, Espinosa & Ortea, 2009
 Volvarina laurauae Espinosa, Ortea, Fernandez-Garcés & Moro, 2007
 Volvarina laureae Espinosa & Ortea, 2012
 Volvarina laurenti Espinosa & Ortea, 2012
 Volvarina leopoldoi Espinosa, Ortea & Magaña, 2018
 Volvarina lilianamariae Espinosa, Ortea & Diez, 2015
 Volvarina linae Espinosa & Ortea, 1999
 Volvarina lineae  Espinosa & Ortea, 2012
 Volvarina lipparinii  T. Cossignani & Lorenz, 2020
 Volvarina lipparinorum  T. Cossignani & Lorenz, 2019
 Volvarina lopezae  Ortea, 2014
 Volvarina lorenzoi Espinosa, Ortea & Pérez-Dionis, 2014 
 Volvarina luzmarina Espinosa, Ortea & Pérez-Dionis, 2014 
 Volvarina mabellae (Melvill & Standen, 1901)
 Volvarina macaoi Espinosa, Moro & Ortea, 2011
 Volvarina maestratii Espinosa & Ortea, 2012
 Volvarina magnini Espinosa & Ortea, 2012
 Volvarina maisiana Espinosa & Ortea, 2013
 Volvarina mangilyana Bozzetti, 2018
 Volvarina maoriana Powell, 1932
 Volvarina marcellii T. Cossignani & Lorenz, 2019 
 Volvarina margitae T. Cossignani & Lorenz, 2019 
 Volvarina mariaodeteae T. Cossignani, 2017 
 Volvarina martinae T. Cossignani & Lorenz, 2021
 Volvarina martini Espinosa, Ortea & Moro, 2010
 Volvarina martinicaensis Espinosa & Ortea, 2013
 Volvarina matesi Espinosa, Ortea & Pérez-Dionis, 2014
 Volvarina mauricetteae Espinosa & Ortea, 2012
 Volvarina maya Espinosa & Ortea, 1998
 Volvarina meguidae Ortea, 2014
 Volvarina mendoncae Ortea, 2014
 Volvarina mexicana Jousseaume, 1875
 Volvarina micans (Petit, 1851)
 Volvarina micros Bavay, 1922
 Volvarina miniginella Espinosa, Ortea & Moro, 2010
 Volvarina mitrella (Risso, 1826) 
 Volvarina mizrahiae Ortea, 2014
 Volvarina monchoi Caballer, Espinosa & Ortea, 2013
 Volvarina monicae Díaz, Espinosa & Ortea, 1996
 Volvarina monilis (Linnaeus, 1758)
  Volvarina montenegroae Ortea, 2014
 Volvarina mores Espinosa & Ortea, 2006
 Volvarina morrocoyensis Caballer, Espinosa & Ortea, 2013
 Volvarina nautica Espinosa & Ortea, 2015
 Volvarina nealei Wakefield & McCleery, 2004
 Volvarina nereidae Espinosa & Ortea, 2013
 Volvarina nibujona Espinosa & Ortea, 2013
 Volvarina nicasioi Espinosa, Ortea & Diez, 2015
 Volvarina nnekae Ortea, 2014
 Volvarina noeli Espinosa & Ortea, 1998
 Volvarina nuriae Moreno & Burnay, 1999
 Volvarina nympha Espinosa & Ortea, 1998
 Volvarina nyokongae Ortea, 2014
 Volvarina nyssa Roth & Coan, 1971
 † Volvarina oblongata (Sacco, 1890) 
 Volvarina obscura (Reeve, 1865)
 Volvarina occidua Cotton, 1944
 Volvarina occulta Espinosa & Ortea, 2013
 Volvarina oceanica Gofas, 1989
 Volvarina ofeliae Cossignani, 1998
 Volvarina ondina Espinosa, Moro & Ortea, 2011
 Volvarina orozcoae Ortea, 2014
 Volvarina osmani Espinosa, Ortea & Moro, 2008
 Volvarina oteroi Espinosa, Ortea & Pérez-Dionis, 2014 
 Volvarina pacificotica Espinosa, Ortea & Magaña, 2018
 Volvarina pallasae Espinosa & Ortea, 2015
 Volvarina pallidula (Dunker, 1871) 
 Volvarina pandorae Espinosa & Ortea, 2015
 Volvarina parviginella Espinosa & Ortea, 2006
 Volvarina parvistriata Suter, 1908
 Volvarina parvitica Espinosa, Ortea & Magaña, 2018
 Volvarina parvula (Locard, 1897) 
 Volvarina pauli de Jong & Coomans, 1988
 Volvarina paumotensis (Pease, 1868)
 Volvarina pedroelcojo Espinosa, Ortea & Diez, 2015
 Volvarina peimbertae Ortea, 2014
 Volvarina penelope Espinosa & Ortea, 2015
 Volvarina pepefragai Espinosa & Ortea, 1997
 Volvarina peregrina Gofas & Fernandes, 1992
 Volvarina pericalles (Tomlin, 1916)
 Volvarina perrieri (Bavay, 1906)
 Volvarina petitiana Boyer, 2018
 Volvarina petricola Espinosa, Moro & Ortea, 2011
 Volvarina philippinarum (Redfield, 1848)
 Volvarina phorcusi Espinosa & Ortea, 2015
 Volvarina plicatula (Suter, 1910)
 Volvarina pontesi Rios & Leal 1993
 Volvarina porcellana (Melvill & Standen, 1912)
 Volvarina pseudophilippinarum Cossignani, 2008
 Volvarina ptychasthena Gofas, 1989
 Volvarina pulchralineata Lussi & Smith, 1996
 Volvarina pupa (Bavay, 1922)
 Volvarina rancholunense Espinosa, Ortea & Diez, 2015
 Volvarina reeveana Boyer, 2018
 Volvarina remyi Espinosa & Ortea, 2012
 Volvarina renkerorum T. Cossignani & Lorenz, 2019
 Volvarina rex Laseron, 1957
 Volvarina riparia Gofas & Fernandes, 1992
 Volvarina roberti (Bavay, 1917)
 Volvarina rubella (C.B. Adams, 1845)
 Volvarina ryalli Boyer, 2006
 Volvarina sabinalensis Espinosa, Ortea & Moro, 2010
 Volvarina sanfelipensis Espinosa & Ortea, 2013
 Volvarina santacruzense Espinosa, Ortea & Diez, 2017
 Volvarina santiagocubense Espinosa, Ortea & Diez, 2015
 Volvarina santiaguera Espinosa, Ortea & Diez, 2013
 Volvarina saramagoi Espinosa, Ortea & Moro, 2013
 Volvarina sauliae (Sowerby, 1846)
 Volvarina schmidlinorum T. Cossignani & Lorenz, 2019
 Volvarina sebastieni Espinosa & Ortea, 2012
 Volvarina serrei (Bavay, 1913)
 Volvarina shlegeli Bozzetti, 2017
 † Volvarina sibuzatiana Lozouet, 2019 
 Volvarina snyderi Espinosa & Ortea, 2012
 Volvarina socoae Espinosa & Ortea, 1999
 Volvarina sofiae Ortea & Espinosa, 1998
 Volvarina somalica Boyer, 2015
 Volvarina somwangi Boyer, 2015
 Volvarina southwicki (Davis, 1904)
 Volvarina splendida Cossignani, 2005
 Volvarina styria (Dall, 1889)
 Volvarina subtriplicata (d'Orbigny, 1842) - three-rib marginella
 Volvarina swenneni Espinosa, Ortea & Pérez-Dionis, 2014
 Volvarina sylviae T. Cossignani & Lorenz, 2021
 Volvarina taeniata (Sowerby II, 1846)
 Volvarina taeniolata Mörch, 1860 - California marginella
 Volvarina taeniolata rosa (Schwengel, 1938)
 Volvarina taina Espinosa & Ortea, 2013
 Volvarina tessae T. Cossignani, 2007
 Volvarina tetamariae Espinosa, Ortea & Moro, 2010
 Volvarina tessae Cossignani, 2007
 Volvarina thaliae Espinosa & Ortea, 2015
 Volvarina thomsonae Ortea, 2014
 Volvarina tobyi Espinosa, Ortea & Diez, 2015
 Volvarina tollere Laseron, 1957
 Volvarina toroensis Espinosa & Ortea, 2015
 Volvarina torresina Laseron, 1957
 Volvarina tripartita Cossignani, 2006
 Volvarina triplicatilla Espinosa & Ortea, 2006
 Volvarina tunicata Boyer, 2000
 Volvarina unilineata (Jousseaume, 1875)
 Volvarina utgei Espinosa & Ortea, 2012
 Volvarina varaderoensis Espinosa, Ortea & Moro, 2010
 Volvarina vassardi Espinosa & Ortea, 2012
 Volvarina veintimilliae Ortea, 2014
 Volvarina veraguasensis Wakefield & McCleery, 2005
 Volvarina verdensis (E.A.Smith, 1875)
 Volvarina verreauxi (Jousseaume, 1875)
 Volvarina virginieae Espinosa & Ortea, 2012
 Volvarina vistamarina Espinosa & Ortea, 2002
 Volvarina vittata Espinosa, Moro & Ortea, 2011
 Volvarina vokesi de Jong & Coomans, 1988
 Volvarina volunta Laseron, 1957
 Volvarina warrenii (Marrat, 1876)
 Volvarina weissmannae Ortea, 2014
 Volvarina xamaneki Espinosa & Ortea, 2015
 Volvarina yaeli Espinosa, J. Martin & Ortea, 2018
 Volvarina yani Espinosa & Ortea, 2012
 Volvarina yayaeli Espinosa, Ortea & Moro, 2009
 Volvarina yolandae Espinosa & Ortea, 2000
 Volvarina yunkaxi Espinosa & Ortea, 2015
 Volvarina zatzae Ortea, 2014
 Volvarina zonata (Kiener, 1841)
 Volvarina zonata f. bilineata Krauss, 1848

Species brought into synonymy
 Volvarina abbotti De Jong & Coomans, 1988: synonym of Plesiocystiscus abbotti (De Jong & Coomans, 1988)
 Volvarina ambigua (Bavay in Dautzenberg, 1912): synonym of Volvarina ampelusica Monterosato, 1906
 Volvarina amphorale (de Souza, 1992): synonym of Prunum amphorale de Souza, 1992
 Volvarina amydrozona (Melvill, 1906): synonym of Balanetta amydrozona (Melvill, 1906)
 Volvarina avenacea auct.: synonym of Prunum bellulum (Dall, 1890)
 Volvarina bahiensis (Tomlin, 1917): synonym of Prunum bahiense (Tomlin, 1917)
 Volvarina biannulata auct.: synonym of Volvarina bilineata (Krauss, 1848)
 Volvarina bibalteata Reeve, 1865: synonym of Volvarina gracilis (C. B. Adams, 1851)
 Volvarina bilineata (Krauss, 1848): synonym of Volvarina zonata f. bilineata (F. Krauss, 1848)
 Volvarina bouvieri Jousseaume, 1877: synonym of Volvarina mediocincta (E. A. Smith, 1875)
 Volvarina californica Tomlin, 1916: synonym of Volvarina taeniolata Mörch, 1860
 Volvarina canilla (Dall, 1927): synonym of Prunum canilla (Dall, 1927)
 Volvarina capensis (Krauss, 1848): synonym of Prunum capense (Krauss, 1848)
 Volvarina cessaci Jousseaume, 1881: synonym of Volvarina taeniata (G. B. Sowerby II, 1846)
 Volvarina cleo (Bartsch, 1915): synonym of Volvarina bilineata (Krauss, 1848)
 Volvarina columnaria (Hedley & May, 1908): synonym of Hydroginella columnaria (Hedley & May, 1908)
 Volvarina curta Monterosato, 1884: synonym of Volvarina mitrella (Risso, 1826)
 Volvarina cylindrica (G. B. Sowerby II, 1846): synonym of Hyalina cylindrica (Sowerby II, 1846)
 Volvarina dawnae Lussi & G. Smith, 1996: synonym of Volvarina adela (Thiele, 1925)
 Volvarina elongata Pease, 1868: synonym of Volvarina elliptica (Redfield, 1870)
 Volvarina fortunata Clover & Macca, 1990: synonym of Prunum fortunatum (Clover & Macca, 1990)
 Volvarina fulva Bavay, 1913: synonym of Volvarina serrei (Bavay, 1913)
 Volvarina fusca (Sowerby II, 1846): synonym of Volvarina exilis (Gmelin, 1791)
 Volvarina fusiformis Reeve, 1865: synonym of Volvarina unilineata (Jousseaume, 1875)
 Volvarina germaini Bavay, 1913: synonym of Volvarina serrei (Bavay, 1913)
 Volvarina guttula Reeve, 1865: synonym of Volvarina southwicki (Davis, 1904)
 Volvarina hahni Mabille, 1884: synonym of Volvarina warrenii (Marrat, 1876)
 Volvarina inconspicua G. Nevill & H. Nevill, 1874: synonym of Volvarina nevilli (Jousseaume, 1875)
 Volvarina inepta (Dall, 1927): synonym of Hyalina discors (Roth, 1974)
 Volvarina infans Reeve, 1865: synonym of Volvarina corusca (Reeve, 1865)
 Volvarina julia Thiele, 1925: synonym of Alaginella atracta (Tomlin, 1918)
 Volvarina lactea (Kiener, 1841): synonym of Volvarina abbreviata (C. B. Adams, 1850)
 Volvarina livida Reeve, 1865: synonym of Volvarina avena (Kiener, 1834)
 Volvarina lucida (Marrat, 1877): synonym of Hyalina lucida (Marrat, 1877)
 Volvarina maoriana (Powell, 1932): synonym of Serrata maoriana (Powell, 1932)
 Volvarina mediocincta (E. A. Smith, 1875): synonym of Mirpurina mediocinta (E. A. Smith, 1875)
 Volvarina meta Thiele, 1925: synonym of Alaginella atracta (Tomlin, 1918)
 Volvarina mixta (Petterd, 1884): synonym of Hydroginella mixta (Petterd, 1884)
 Volvarina modulata (Laseron, 1957): synonym of Mesoginella modulata (Laseron, 1957)
 Volvarina mustelina (Angas, 1871): synonym of Serrata mustelina (Angas, 1871)
 Volvarina nevilli (Jousseaume, 1875): synonym of Demissa nevilli (Jousseaume, 1875)
 Volvarina olivaeformis (Kiener, 1834): synonym of Prunum olivaeforme (Kiener, 1834)
 Volvarina parallela Dall, 1918: synonym of Volvarina taeniolata Mörch, 1860
 Volvarina parviginella Espinosa & Ortea, 2006: synonym of Marigordiella parviginella (Espinosa & Ortea, 2006)
 Volvarina patagonica Martens, 1881: synonym of Volvarina warrenii (Marrat, 1876)
 Volvarina paula Thiele, 1925: synonym of Alaginella atracta (Tomlin, 1918)
 Volvarina paxillus (Reeve, 1865): synonym of Volvarina attenuata (Reeve, 1865)
 Volvarina pellucida Tenison-Woods, 1877: synonym of Serrata mustelina (Angas, 1871)
 Volvarina pergrandis Clover, 1974: synonym of Prunum pergrande (Clover, 1974)
 Volvarina quadriplicata Risso, 1826: synonym of Volvarina mitrella (Risso, 1826)
 Volvarina quadripunctata (Locard, 1897): synonym of Volvarina taeniata (G. B. Sowerby II, 1846)
 Volvarina redfieldii (Tryon, 1883): synonym of Prunum redfieldii (Tryon, 1883)
 Volvarina rubrifasciata Jousseaume, 1875: synonym of Serrata fasciata (Sowerby II, 1846)
 Volvarina rufescens Reeve, 1865: synonym of Volvarina exilis (Gmelin, 1791)
 Volvarina serrata (Gaskoin, 1849): synonym of Serrata serrata (Gaskoin, 1849)
 Volvarina simeri Jousseaume, 1875: synonym of Volvarina exilis (Gmelin, 1791)
 Volvarina sordida (Reeve, 1865): synonym of Serrata delessertiana (Récluz, 1841)
 Volvarina stanislas Tenison-Woods, 1877: synonym of Serrata mustelina (Angas, 1871)
 Volvarina superstes (Laseron, 1957): synonym of Hydroginella superstes (Laseron, 1957)
 Volvarina tenuilabra (Tomlin, 1917): synonym of Hyalina pallida (Linnaeus, 1758)
 Volvarina torticulum (Dall, 1881): synonym of Prunum torticulum (Dall, 1881)
 Volvarina trailli (Reeve, 1865): synonym of Cryptospira trailli (Reeve, 1865)
 Volvarina tribalteata Reeve, 1865: synonym of Volvarina exilis (Gmelin, 1791)
 Volvarina tridentata (Tate, 1878): synonym of Hydroginella tridentata (Tate, 1878)
 Volvarina umlaasensis Lussi & G. Smith, 1996: synonym of Alaginella umlaasensis (Lussi & G. Smith, 1996)
 Volvarina veliei (Pilsbry, 1896): synonym of Prunum succineum (Conrad, 1846)
 Volvarina vermiculata Jousseaume, 1875: synonym of Volvarina avena (Kiener, 1834)
 Volvarina vincentiana (Cotton, 1944): synonym of Hydroginella vincentiana (Cotton, 1944)

References

 
 Jensen, R. H. (1997). A Checklist and Bibliography of the Marine Molluscs of Bermuda. Unp. , 547 pp
 Boyer, Franck
 2000. The genus Volvarina (Volutacea : Marginellidae) in Brazil. Part 1 : revision of the species described by A. Bavay, and closely related species. Novapex 1(2):35-55.
 2001. Two Volvarina (Marginellidae) from deep waters off Northern Honduras. Novapex 2(1):3-8.
 Cossignani T. (2006). Marginellidae & Cystiscidae of the World. L'Informatore Piceno. 408pp
 Ortea J. (2014). Cómo integrar Ciencia y Naturaleza: Descripción de nuevas especies de Volvarina Hinds, 1844 (Mollusca: Marginellidae) de la isla de Guadeloupe y sus islotes satélites (Antillas Menores, Mar Caribe), nombradas en honor de treinta mujeres distinguidas con el Premio L'Oreal-Unesco. Revista de la Real Academia Canaria de Ciencias. 26: 129-188.
 Ortea J. (2019). Dos nuevas especies de Sao Vicente, dedicadas a B. Leza y a la morna, refuerzan proponer Mirpurina Ortea, Moro & Espinosa, 2019, como género independiente de Marginellidae. Avicennia. 24: 55-68.

External links
  Coovert, G. A.; Coovert, H. K. (1995). Revision of the supraspecific classification of marginelliform gastropods. The Nautilus. 109(2-3): 43-100
 

Marginellidae
Gastropod genera
Taxa named by Richard Brinsley Hinds